Al Ghuwariyah (also spelled Leghwairiya) is a town located in Al Khor Municipality in the state Qatar. Al Ghuwariyah was once a municipality of Qatar until it was merged with Al Khor Municipality, which is in the east, in 2004.

It has been mostly populated by the Al-Naimi tribe of Qatar since the early 1920s.

Etymology
Two suggestions have been put forth for the origin of Al Ghuwariyah's name. The first is that it is derived from 'alghar', the Arabic term for the laurel family of plants. This is considered unlikely as this family of plants is not found in Qatar. The more plausible explanation is that the name derives from the Arabic word 'ghar', which translates to cave. This is lent credence by the presence of two prominent caves nearby.

History
An entry for Al Ghuwariyah can be found in J.G. Lorimer's 1908 publication Gazetteer of the Persian Gulf. He describes it as a nomadic camping ground 12 miles south-west of Huwailah and mentions a nearby masonry well, 8 fathoms deep, that yields good water.

After Qatar started to receive substantial profits from its oil extraction activities in the 1960s and 1970s, the government launched several housing projects for its citizens. As part of this initiative, 55 houses were built in Al Ghuwariyah by 1976.

According to the Ministry of Environment, there were about 65 total households within the town limits in 2014.

Administration

Al Ghuwariyah Municipality

Al Ghuwariyah was a municipality until 2004, when it was merged with Al Khor. It did not administer over any other census-designated cities or towns except for itself.

In 2004 census, out of a population of 2,159, the number of Muslims amounted to 1,666, Christians amounted to 52, and the remaining 441 inhabitants identified as following other religions.

Registered live births
The following table is a breakdown of registered live births by nationality and sex for Al Ghuwariyah. Places of birth are based on the home municipality of the mother at birth.

Local government

After free elections of the Central Municipal Council first took place in Qatar during 1999, Al Ghuwariyah was designated the seat of constituency no. 29. It would remain the headquarters of constituency no. 29 for the next three consecutive elections until the fifth municipal elections in 2015, when it was proclaimed the seat of constituency no. 28. Also included in its constituency is part of Al Suwaihliya, Umm Al Maa, Al Daoudiyah, Ain Al Nuaman, south Zubarah, Ain Sinan, and Abu Al Seneem. 

In the inaugural municipal elections in 1999, Nasser Abdullah Al Kaabi won the elections, receiving 66.1%, or 115 votes. In second place was Mubarak Abdullah Al-Nuaimi, whose share of the votes was 29.3%, or 51 votes. Voter turnout was 87%. Al Kaabi retained his seat in the 2002 and 2007 elections. In 2011, Al Kaabi lost his seat to Saeed Mubarak Al Rashedi, who retained his seat in the 2015 elections.

The Al Ghuwariyah office of the Al Khor Municipality is headed by Nasser Al Nuaimi as of 2017.

Health
Al Ghuwariyah's first health center was opened in July 2015.

Planned developments
In March 2017, the director of Al Ghuwariyah, Nasser Al Naimi, announced a major plan to upgrade the infrastructure of Al Ghuwariyah. The plan intends on improving the sewage, street maintenance and lighting of the town and adding additional sidewalks and pedestrian crossings.

Visitor attractions
Al Ghuwariyah Family Park was opened in 2017. Occupying an area of 9,234 sq meters, facilities include a playground with seating, bathrooms and a guard office.

Education
The following school is located in Al Ghuwariyah:

References

Populated places in Al Khor